Family Ties is a novel by Danielle Steel, published by Delacorte Press in June 2010. The book is Steel's eighty first novel.

Synopsis
The novel follows 42-year-old architect Annie Ferguson.

References

2010 American novels
American romance novels
Novels by Danielle Steel
Delacorte Press books